A guild is an association of artisans and merchants who oversee the practice of their craft/trade in a particular territory. The earliest types of guild formed as organizations of tradespeople belonging to a professional association. They sometimes depended on grants of letters patent from a monarch or other ruler to enforce the flow of trade to their self-employed members, and to retain ownership of tools and the supply of materials, but most were regulated by the city government. Guild members found guilty of cheating the public would be fined or banned from the guild. A lasting legacy of traditional guilds are the guildhalls constructed and used as guild meeting-places. 

Typically the key "privilege" was that only guild members were allowed to sell their goods or practice their skill within the city. There might be controls on minimum or maximum prices, hours of trading, numbers of apprentices, and many other things. Critics argued that these rules reduced free competition, but defenders maintained that they protected professional standards.

An important result of the guild framework was the emergence of universities at Bologna (established in 1088), Oxford (at least since 1096) and Paris; they originated as guilds of students (as at Bologna) or of masters (as at Paris).

History of guilds

Early guild-like associations 

Naram-Sin of Akkad (c. 2254–2218 BC), grandson of Sargon of Akkad who had unified Sumeria and Assyria into the Akkadian Empire, promulgated common Mesopotamian standards for length, area, volume, weight, time, and shekels, which were used by artisan guilds in each city. Code of Hammurabi Law 234 (c. 1755–1750 BC) stipulated a 2-shekel wage for each 60-gur (300-bushel) vessel constructed in an employment contract between a shipbuilder and a ship-owner. Law 275 stipulated a ferry rate of 3-gerah per day on a charterparty between a ship charterer and a shipmaster. Law 276 stipulated a 2-gerah per day freight rate on a contract of affreightment between a charterer and shipmaster, while Law 277 stipulated a -shekel per day freight rate for a 60-gur vessel.

A type of guild was known in Roman times. Known as collegium, collegia or corpus, these were organised groups of merchants who specialised in a particular craft and whose membership of the group was voluntary. One such example is the corpus naviculariorum, a collegium of merchant mariners based at Rome's La Ostia port. The Roman guilds failed to survive the collapse of the Roman Empire.

A collegium was any association or corporation that acted as a legal entity. In 1816, an archeological excavation in Minya, Egypt produced a Nerva–Antonine dynasty-era (second-century AD) clay tablet from the ruins of the Temple of Antinous in Antinoöpolis, Aegyptus that prescribed the rules and membership dues of a burial society collegium established in Lanuvium, Italia in approximately 133 AD. Following the passage of the Lex Julia in 45 BC, and its reaffirmation during the reign of Caesar Augustus (27 BC–14 AD), collegia required the approval of the Roman Senate or the emperor in order to be authorized as legal bodies. Ruins at Lambaesis date the formation of burial societies among Roman soldiers and mariners to the reign of Septimius Severus (193–211) in 198 AD. In September 2011, archeological investigations done at the site of an artificial harbor in Rome, the Portus, revealed inscriptions in a shipyard constructed during the reign of Trajan (98–117) indicating the existence of a shipbuilders guild. Collegia also included fraternities of priests overseeing sacrifices, practicing augury, keeping religious texts, arranging festivals, and maintaining specific religious cults.

Post-classical guild 

There were several types of guilds, including the two main categories of merchant guilds and craft guilds but also the frith guild and religious guild. Guilds arose beginning in the High Middle Ages as craftsmen united to protect their common interests. In the German city of Augsburg craft guilds are mentioned in the Towncharter of 1156.

The continental system of guilds and merchants arrived in England after the Norman Conquest, with incorporated societies of merchants in each town or city holding exclusive rights of doing business there. In many cases they became the governing body of a town. For example, London's Guildhall became the seat of the Court of Common Council of the City of London Corporation, the world's oldest continuously elected local government, whose members to this day must be Freemen of the city. The Freedom of the City, effective from the Middle Ages until 1835, gave the right to trade, and was only bestowed upon members of a Guild or Livery.

Early egalitarian communities called "guilds" were denounced by Catholic clergy for their "conjurations" — the binding oaths sworn among the members to support one another in adversity, kill specific enemies, and back one another in feuds or in business ventures. The occasion for these oaths were drunken banquets held on December 26. In 858, West Francian Bishop Hincmar sought vainly to Christianise the guilds.

In the Early Middle Ages, most of the Roman craft organisations, originally formed as religious confraternities, had disappeared, with the apparent exceptions of stonecutters and perhaps glassmakers, mostly the people that had local skills. Gregory of Tours tells a miraculous tale of a builder whose art and techniques suddenly left him, but were restored by an apparition of the Virgin Mary in a dream. Michel Rouche remarks that the story speaks for the importance of practically transmitted journeymanship.

In France, guilds were called corps de métiers. According to Viktor Ivanovich Rutenburg, "Within the guild itself there was very little division of labour, which tended to operate rather between the guilds. Thus, according to Étienne Boileau's Book of Handicrafts, by the mid-13th century there were no less than 100 guilds in Paris, a figure which by the 14th century had risen to 350." There were different guilds of metal-workers: the farriers, knife-makers, locksmiths, chain-forgers, nail-makers, often formed separate and distinct corporations; the armourers were divided into helmet-makers, escutcheon-makers, harness-makers, harness-polishers, etc. In Catalan towns, especially at Barcelona, guilds or gremis were a basic agent in the society: a shoemakers' guild is recorded in 1208.

In England, specifically in the City of London Corporation, more than 110 guilds, referred to as livery companies, survive today, with the oldest  years old. Other groups, such as the Worshipful Company of Tax Advisers, have been formed far more recently. Membership in a livery company is expected for individuals participating in the governance of The City, as the Lord Mayor and the Remembrancer.

The guild system reached a mature state in Germany  and held on in German cities into the 19th century, with some special privileges for certain occupations remaining today. In the 15th century, Hamburg had 100 guilds, Cologne 80, and Lübeck 70.

Not all city economies were controlled by guilds; some cities were "free." Where guilds were in control, they shaped labor, production and trade; they had strong controls over instructional capital, and the modern concepts of a lifetime progression of apprentice to craftsman, and then from journeyman eventually to widely recognized master and grandmaster began to emerge. In order to become a master, a journeyman would have to go on a three-year voyage called journeyman years. The practice of the journeyman years still exists in Germany and France.

As production became more specialized, trade guilds were divided and subdivided, eliciting the squabbles over jurisdiction that produced the paperwork by which economic historians trace their development: The metalworking guilds of Nuremberg were divided among dozens of independent trades in the boom economy of the 13th century, and there were 101 trades in Paris by 1260. In Ghent, as in Florence, the woolen textile industry developed as a congeries of specialized guilds. The appearance of the European guilds was tied to the emergent money economy, and to urbanization. Before this time it was not possible to run a money-driven organization, as commodity money was the normal way of doing business.

The guild was at the center of European handicraft organization into the 16th century. In France, a resurgence of the guilds in the second half of the 17th century is symptomatic of Louis XIV and Jean Baptiste Colbert's administration's concerns to impose unity, control production, and reap the benefits of transparent structure in the shape of efficient taxation.

The guilds were identified with organizations enjoying certain privileges (letters patent), usually issued by the king or state and overseen by local town business authorities (some kind of chamber of commerce). These were the predecessors of the modern patent and trademark system. The guilds also maintained funds in order to support infirm or elderly members, as well as widows and orphans of guild members, funeral benefits, and a 'tramping' allowance for those needing to travel to find work. As the guild system of the City of London declined during the 17th century, the Livery Companies transformed into mutual assistance fraternities along such lines.

European guilds imposed long standardized periods of apprenticeship, and made it difficult for those lacking the capital to set up for themselves or without the approval of their peers to gain access to materials or knowledge, or to sell into certain markets, an area that equally dominated the guilds' concerns. These are defining characteristics of mercantilism in economics, which dominated most European thinking about political economy until the rise of classical economics.

The guild system survived the emergence of early capitalists, which began to divide guild members into "haves" and dependent "have-nots". The civil struggles that characterize the 14th-century towns and cities were struggles in part between the greater guilds and the lesser artisanal guilds, which depended on piecework. "In Florence, they were openly distinguished: the Arti maggiori and the Arti minori—already there was a popolo grasso and a popolo magro". Fiercer struggles were those between essentially conservative guilds and the merchant class, which increasingly came to control the means of production and the capital that could be ventured in expansive schemes, often under the rules of guilds of their own. German social historians trace the Zunftrevolution, the urban revolution of guildmembers against a controlling urban patriciate, sometimes reading into them, however, perceived foretastes of the class struggles of the 19th century.

In the countryside, where guild rules did not operate, there was freedom for the entrepreneur with capital to organize cottage industry, a network of cottagers who spun and wove in their own premises on his account, provided with their raw materials, perhaps even their looms, by the capitalist who took a share of the profits. Such a dispersed system could not so easily be controlled where there was a vigorous local market for the raw materials: wool was easily available in sheep-rearing regions, whereas silk was not.

Organization 
In Florence, Italy, there were seven to twelve "greater guilds" and fourteen "lesser guilds" the most important of the greater guilds was that for judges and notaries, who handled the legal business of all the other guilds and often served as an arbitrator of disputes. Other greater guilds include the wool, silk, and the money changers' guilds. They prided themselves on a reputation for very high-quality work, which was rewarded with premium prices. The guilds fined members who deviated from standards. Other greater guilds included those of doctors, druggists, and furriers. Among the lesser guilds, were those for bakers, saddle makers, ironworkers and other artisans. They had a sizable membership, but lacked the political and social standing necessary to influence city affairs.

The guild was made up by experienced and confirmed experts in their field of handicraft. They were called master craftsmen. Before a new employee could rise to the level of mastery, he had to go through a schooling period during which he was first called an apprenticeship. After this period he could rise to the level of journeyman. Apprentices would typically not learn more than the most basic techniques until they were trusted by their peers to keep the guild's or company's secrets.

Like journey, the distance that could be travelled in a day, the title 'journeyman' derives from the French words for 'day' (jour and journée) from which came the middle English word journei. Journeymen were able to work for other masters, unlike apprentices, and generally paid by the day and were thus day labourers. After being employed by a master for several years, and after producing a qualifying piece of work, the apprentice was granted the rank of journeyman and was given documents (letters or certificates from his master and/or the guild itself) which certified him as a journeyman and entitled him to travel to other towns and countries to learn the art from other masters. These journeys could span large parts of Europe and were an unofficial way of communicating new methods and techniques, though by no means all journeymen made such travels — they were most common in Germany and Italy, and in other countries journeymen from small cities would often visit the capital.

After this journey and several years of experience, a journeyman could be received as master craftsman, though in some guilds this step could be made straight from apprentice. This would typically require the approval of all masters of a guild, a donation of money and other goods (often omitted for sons of existing members), and the production of a so-called "masterpiece", which would illustrate the abilities of the aspiring master craftsman; this was often retained by the guild.

The medieval guild was established by charters or letters patent or similar authority by the city or the ruler and normally held a monopoly on trade in its craft within the city in which it operated: handicraft workers were forbidden by law to run any business if they were not members of a guild, and only masters were allowed to be members of a guild. Before these privileges were legislated, these groups of handicraft workers were simply called 'handicraft associations'.

The town authorities might be represented in the guild meetings and thus had a means of controlling the handicraft activities. This was important since towns very often depended on a good reputation for export of a narrow range of products, on which not only the guild's, but the town's, reputation depended. Controls on the association of physical locations to well-known exported products, e.g. wine from the Champagne and Bordeaux regions of France, tin-glazed earthenwares from certain cities in Holland, lace from Chantilly, etc., helped to establish a town's place in global commerce — this led to modern trademarks.

In many German and Italian cities, the more powerful guilds often had considerable political influence, and sometimes attempted to control the city authorities. In the 14th century, this led to numerous bloody uprisings, during which the guilds dissolved town councils and detained patricians in an attempt to increase their influence. In fourteenth-century north-east Germany, people of Wendish, i.e. Slavic, origin were not allowed to join some guilds. According to Wilhelm Raabe, "down into the eighteenth century no German guild accepted a Wend."

Fall of the guilds 

Ogilvie (2004) argues that guilds negatively affected quality, skills, and innovation. Through what economists now call "rent-seeking" they imposed deadweight losses on the economy. Ogilvie argues they generated limited positive externalities and notes that industry began to flourish only after the guilds faded away. Guilds persisted over the centuries because they redistributed resources to politically powerful merchants. On the other hand, Ogilvie agrees, guilds created "social capital" of shared norms, common information, mutual sanctions, and collective political action. This social capital benefited guild members, even as it arguably hurt outsiders.

The guild system became a target of much criticism towards the end of the 18th century and the beginning of the 19th century. Critics argued that they hindered free trade and technological innovation, technology transfer and business development. According to several accounts of this time, guilds became increasingly involved in simple territorial struggles against each other and against free practitioners of their arts.

Two of the most outspoken critics of the guild system were Jean-Jacques Rousseau and Adam Smith, and all over Europe a tendency to oppose government control over trades in favour of laissez-faire free market systems grew rapidly and made its way into the political and legal systems. Many people who participated in the French Revolution saw guilds as a last remnant of feudalism. The d'Allarde Law of 2 March 1791 suppressed the guilds in France. In 1803 the Napoleonic Code banned any coalition of workmen whatsoever. Smith wrote in The Wealth of Nations (Book I, Chapter X, paragraph 72):

Karl Marx in his Communist Manifesto also criticized the guild system for its rigid gradation of social rank and the relation of oppressor/oppressed entailed by this system. It was the 18th and 19th centuries that saw the beginning of the low regard in which some people hold the guilds to this day. In part due to their own inability to control unruly corporate behavior, the tide of public opinion turned against the guilds.

Because of industrialization and modernization of the trade and industry, and the rise of powerful nation-states that could directly issue patent and copyright protections — often revealing the trade secrets — the guilds' power faded. After the French Revolution they gradually fell in most European nations over the course of the 19th century, as the guild system was disbanded and replaced by laws that promoted free trade. As a consequence of the decline of guilds, many former handicraft workers were forced to seek employment in the emerging manufacturing industries, using not closely guarded techniques formerly protected by guilds, but rather the standardized methods controlled by corporations.
Interest in the medieval guild system was revived during the late 19th century, among far-right circles. Fascism in Italy (among other countries) implemented corporatism, operating at the national rather than city level, to try to imitate the corporatism of the Middle Ages.

Influence of guilds 

Guilds are sometimes said to be the precursors of modern cartels. Guilds, however, can also be seen as a set of self-employed skilled craftsmen with ownership and control over the materials and tools they needed to produce their goods. Some argue that guilds operated more like cartels than they were like trade unions (Olson 1982). However, the journeymen organizations, which were at the time illegal, may have been influential.

The exclusive privilege of a guild to produce certain goods or provide certain services was similar in spirit and character to the original patent systems that surfaced in England in 1624. These systems played a role in ending the guilds' dominance, as trade secret methods were superseded by modern firms directly revealing their techniques, and counting on the state to enforce their legal monopoly.

Some guild traditions still remain in a few handicrafts, in Europe especially among shoemakers and barbers. These are, however, not very important economically except as reminders of the responsibilities of some trades toward the public.

Modern antitrust law could be said to derive in some ways from the original statutes by which the guilds were abolished in Europe.

Economic consequences 
The economic consequences of guilds have led to heated debates among economic historians. On the one side, scholars say that since merchant guilds persisted over long periods they must have been efficient institutions (since inefficient institutions die out). Others say they persisted not because they benefited the entire economy but because they benefited the owners, who used political power to protect them. Ogilvie (2011) says they regulated trade for their own benefit, were monopolies, distorted markets, fixed prices, and restricted entrance into the guild. Ogilvie (2008) argues that their long apprenticeships were unnecessary to acquire skills, and their conservatism reduced the rate of innovation and made the society poorer. She says their main goal was rent seeking, that is, to shift money to the membership at the expense of the entire economy.

Epstein and Prak's book (2008) rejects Ogilvie's conclusions. Specifically, Epstein argues that guilds were cost-sharing rather than rent-seeking institutions. They located and matched masters and likely apprentices through monitored learning. Whereas the acquisition of craft skills required experience-based learning, he argues that this process necessitated many years in apprenticeship.

The extent to which guilds were able to monopolize markets is also debated.

Women in guilds

For the most part, medieval guilds limited women's participation, and usually only the widows and daughters of known masters were allowed in. Even if a woman entered a guild, she was excluded from guild offices. It's important to note that while this was the overarching practice, there were guilds and professions that did allow women's participation, and that the Medieval era was an ever-changing, mutable society—especially considering that it spanned hundreds of years and many different cultures. There were multiple accounts of women's participation in guilds in England and the Continent. In a study of London silkwomen of the 15th century by Marian K. Dale, she notes that medieval women could inherit property, belong to guilds, manage estates, and run the family business if widowed. The Livre des métiers de Paris (Book of Trades of Paris) was compiled by Étienne Boileau, the Grand Provost of Paris under King Louis IX. It documents that 5 out of 110 Parisian guilds were female monopolies, and that only a few guilds systematically excluded women. Boileau notes that some professions were also open to women: surgeons, glass-blowers, chain-mail forgers. Entertainment guilds also had a significant number of women members. John, Duke of Berry documents payments to female musicians from Le Puy, Lyons, and Paris.

Women did have problems with entering healers' guilds, as opposed to their relative freedom in trade or craft guilds. Their status in healers' guilds were often challenged. The idea that medicine should only be practiced by men was supported by some religious and secular authorities at the time. It is believed that the Inquisition and witch hunts throughout the ages contributed to the lack of women in medical guilds.

Modern

Modern Quasi-Guilds and Licensing Practices
Professional organizations replicate guild structure and operation. Professions such as architecture, engineering, geology, and land surveying require varying lengths of apprenticeships before one can gain a "professional" certification. These certifications hold great legal weight: most states make them a prerequisite to practising there.

Though most guilds died off by the middle of the nineteenth century, quasi-guilds persist today, primarily in the fields of law, medicine, engineering, and academia. Paralleling or soon after the fall of guilds in Britain and in the United States professional associations began to form. In America a number of interested parties sought to emulate the model of apprenticeship which European guilds of the Middle Ages had honed to achieve their ends of establishing exclusivity in trades as well as the English concept of a gentleman which had come to be associated with higher income and craftsmanship

Licensing and accreditation practices which typically result from the lobbying of professional associations constitute the modern equivalent of a 'guild-privelge', albeit in contrast to guilds of the Middle Ages which held a letters patent which explicitly granted them monopolies on the provision of services, today's quasi-guild privileges are subtler, more complex, and less directly restrictive to consumers in their nature.

Nevertheless, it can be argued quasi-guild privileges are in many cases designed not just to serve some notion of public good, but to facilitate the establishing and maintaining of exclusivity in a field of work.

There are often subtle dichotomies present in attempting to answer the question of whether modern licensing and accreditation practices are intended to serve the public good, however it be defined. For medieval guilds this dichotomy is exemplified by differing explanations of the same phenomena; of limiting work hours among guild members. Sheilagh Ogilvie argues that this was intended to mitigate competition among guild members, while Dorothy Terry argues this was to prevent guild members from working late into the night while tired and when lighting is poor and therefore producing low quality work. In modern times, while licensing practices are usually argued to in some way protect members of the public (e.g. by ensuring quality standards), it usually can also be argued that these practices have been engineered to limit the number of 'outsiders' who gain entrance to a given field.

As argued by Paull starr and Ronald Hamowy, both of whose focus is on the development of medicine in America, the tying of medical licensing practices to universities was a process intended to do more than protect the public from 'quackery', but was engineered to be unnecessarily prolonged, inefficient, and a costly process so as to deter 'outsiders' from getting into the field, thereby enhancing the prestige and earning power of medical professionals.

The university system in general continues to serve as a basis upon which modern quasi-guilds operate in the form of professionalism. 'Universitas' in the Middle Ages meant a society of masters who had the capacity for self-governance, and this term was adopted by students and teachers who came together in the twelfth century to form scholars guilds. Though guilds mostly died off by the middle of the nineteenth century, the scholars guild persisted due to its peripheral nature to an industrialized economy. In the words of Elliot Krause,"The university and scholars' guilds held onto their power over membership, training, and workplace because early capitalism was not interested in it (there was no product that the capitalist wished to produce)...the cultural prestige of knowledge itself helped keep the scholars' guild and the university alive while all other guilds failed."

- Elliot Krause, The Death of Guilds (1996)Though in theory anyone can start a college, the 'privilege' in this case is the linking of federal aid to accreditation. While accreditation of a university is entirely optional, attending an accredited university is a prerequisite to receiving federal aid, and this has a powerful influence on limiting consumer options in the field of education as it provides a mechanism to limit entrepreneurial 'outsiders' from entering the field of education. George Leef and Roxana Burris study the accreditation system for which they observe is 'highly collegial' and potentially bias in the fact that accreditation review is performed by members of schools who will in turn be reviewed by many of the same people who they have reviewed. They further question the effectiveness of the methods involved in accreditation,"Although accreditation is usually justified as a means of giving students and parents an assurance of educational quality, it is important to note that the accreditors do not endeavor to assess the quality of individual programs or departments.... The accreditation system is not based on an evaluation of the results of an institution, but rather upon an evaluation of its inputs and processes. If the inputs and processes look good, acceptable educational quality is assumed. It is as if an organization decided which automobiles would be allowed to be sold by checking to make sure that each car model had tires, doors, an engine and so forth and had been assembled by workers with proper training—but without actually driving any cars"

- George C. Leef and Roxana D. Burris, Can College Accreditation Live Up To Its Promise?Taken in the context of guilds, it can be argued that the purpose of accreditation is to provide a mechanism for members of the scholars guild to protect itself, both by limiting outsiders from entering the field and by enforcing established norms onto one another. Contriving means to limit the number of outsiders who gain an entrance to a field (exclusivity) and to enforce work norms among members were both distinguishing feature of guilds in the Middle Ages.

Quasi-guilds in the Information Economy
In 1998, Thomas W. Malone championed a modern variant of the guild structure for independent contractors and remote workers. Insurance including any professional legal liability, intellectual capital protections, an ethical code perhaps enforced by peer pressure and software, and other benefits of a strong association of producers of knowledge, benefit from economies of scale, and may prevent cut-throat competition that leads to inferior services undercutting prices. As with historical guilds, such a structure will resist foreign competition.

The open-source-software movement has from time to time explored a guild-like structure to unite against competition from Microsoft, e.g. Advogato assigns journeyer and master ranks to those committing to work only or mostly on free software.

Patents loosely serve as a form of guild privilege in that they restrict potential newcomers to a field of service. The idea of a patent being applied to intangibles (e.g. intellectual patents) has been called to question by various authors. In Capital and Ideology (2000) Thomas Picketty questions the validity of patents being granted to agricultural corporations who claim to have 'invented' certain GMO seeds. According to Picketty, the falsity of such claims is that the specific breakthrough which allowed for the development of these GMO seeds was in fact only the end outcome of generations of public investment in education and research.

Europe 
In many European countries, guilds have experienced a revival as local trade organizations for craftsmen, primarily in traditional skills. They may function as forums for developing competence and are often the local units of a national employer's organisation.

In the City of London, the ancient guilds survive as livery companies, all of which play a ceremonial role in the city's many customs. The City of London livery companies maintain strong links with their respective trade, craft or profession, some still retain regulatory, inspection or enforcement roles. The senior members of the City of London Livery Companies (known as liverymen) elect the sheriffs and approve the candidates for the office of Lord Mayor of London. Guilds also survive in many other towns and cities the UK including in Preston, Lancashire, as the Preston Guild Merchant where among other celebrations descendants of burgesses are still admitted into membership. With the City of London livery companies, the UK has over 300 extant guilds and growing.

In 1878, the London livery companies established the City and Guilds of London Institute the forerunner of the engineering school (still called City and Guilds College) at Imperial College London. The aim of the City and Guilds of London Institute was the advancement of technical education. "City and Guilds" operates as an examining and accreditation body for vocational, managerial and engineering qualifications from entry-level craft and trade skills up to post-doctoral achievement. A separate organisation, the City and Guilds of London Art School has also close ties with the London livery companies and is involved in the training of master craftworkers in stone and wood carving, as well as fine artists.

In Germany, there are no longer any Zünfte (or Gilden – the terms used were rather different from town to town), nor any restriction of a craft to a privileged corporation. However, under one other of their old names albeit a less frequent one, Innungen, guilds continue to exist as private member clubs with membership limited to practitioners of particular trades or activities. These clubs are corporations under public law, albeit the membership is voluntary; the president normally comes from the ranks of master-craftsmen and is called Obermeister ("master-in-chief"). Journeymen elect their own representative bodies, with their president having the traditional title of Altgesell (senior journeyman).

There are also "craft chambers" (Handwerkskammern), which have less resemblance to ancient guilds in that they are organized for all crafts in a certain region, not just one. In them membership is mandatory, and they serve to establish self-governance of the crafts.

Guilds were abolished in France during the French Revolution. Following a decree of 4 August 1789, they survived until March 1791 when they were finally abolished.

India 
India's guilds include the Students Guild, Indian Engineers Guild, and the Safety Guild. Other professional associations include the Indian medical Association, Indian Engineers, Indian Dental Association, United nurses Association, etc.
Most of them use Union, Association or Society as suffix.

North America 
In the United States guilds exist in several fields. Often, they are better characterized as a labor union — for example, The Newspaper Guild is a labor union for journalists and other newspaper workers, with over 30,000 members in North America.

In the film and television industry, guild membership is generally a prerequisite for working on major productions in certain capacities. The Screen Actors Guild, Directors Guild of America, Writers Guild of America, East, Writers Guild of America, West and other profession-specific guilds have the ability to exercise strong control in the cinema of the United States as a result of a rigid system of intellectual-property rights and a history of power-brokers also holding guild membership (e.g., DreamWorks Pictures founder Steven Spielberg was, and is, a DGA member). These guilds maintain their own contracts with production companies to ensure a certain number of their members are hired for roles in each film or television production, and that their members are paid a minimum of guild "scale," along with other labor protections. These guilds set high standards for membership, and exclude professional actors, writers, etc. who do not abide by the strict rules for competing within the film and television industry in America.

Real-estate brokerage offers an example of a modern American guild system. Signs of guild behavior in real-estate brokerage include: standard pricing (6% of the home price), strong affiliation among all practitioners, self-regulation (see National Association of Realtors), strong cultural identity (the Realtor brand), little price variation with quality differences, and traditional methods in use by all practitioners. In September 2005 the U.S. Department of Justice filed an antitrust lawsuit against the National Association of Realtors, challenging NAR practices that (the DOJ asserted) prevent competition from practitioners who use different methods. The DOJ and the Federal Trade Commission in 2005 advocated against state laws, supported by NAR, that disadvantage new kinds of brokers. U.S. v. National Assoc. of Realtors, Civil Action No. 05C-5140 (N.D. Ill. Sept. 7, 2005).

The practice of law in the United States also exemplifies modern guilds at work. Every state maintains its own bar association, supervised by that state's highest court. The court decides the criteria for entering and staying in the legal profession. In most states, every attorney must become a member of that state's bar association in order to practice law. State laws forbid any person from engaging in the unauthorized practice of law and practicing attorneys are subject to rules of professional conduct that are enforced by the state's supreme court.

Medical associations comparable to guilds include the state Medical Boards, the American Medical Association, and the American Dental Association. Medical licensing in most states requires specific training, tests and years of low-paid apprenticeship (internship and residency) under harsh working conditions. Even qualified international or out-of-state doctors may not practice without acceptance by the local medical guild (Medical board). Similarly, nurses and physicians' practitioners have their own guilds. A doctor cannot work as a physician's assistant unless (s)he separately trains, tests and apprentices as one.

Australia 
Australia has several guilds. The most notable of these is The Pharmacy Guild of Australia, created in 1927 as the Federated Pharmaceutical Services Guild of Australia. The Pharmacy Guild serves "6,000 community pharmacies," while also providing training and standards for the country's pharmacists. Australia's other guilds include the Australian Directors Guild, representing the country's directors, documentary makers and animators, the Australian Writers' Guild, the Australian Butcher's Guild, a fraternity of independent butchers which provides links to resources like Australian meat standards and a guide to different beef cuts, and The Artists Guild, a craft guild focusing on female artists.

In fiction
 In the Dune universe, an organization known as the Spacing Guild controls the means of interstellar travel and thus wields great power. 
 In the classic 1939 film The Wizard of Oz, an organization known as the Lollipop Guild was a group of Munchkins in the Munchkin Country, who welcomed Dorothy Gale to the Land of Oz with song and dance upon her arrival. 
 In video games, guilds are used as associations of players or characters with similar interests, such as dungeons, crafting, or player versus player combat. 
 In Star Wars, there is a bounty hunter guild.
 In Terry Pratchett's Discworld novels, the guilds of the city of Ankh-Morpork are major civic and economic institutions, with some serving as equivalents to trade unions or government bodies. The Presidents and Heads of the Guilds form an unofficial city council which may advise the Patrician during times of crisis. As part of Lord Vetinari's efforts to 'organise' and reduce crime, criminals including thieves, assassins and 'seamstresses' were allowed to reorganise as guilds.
 In The Venture Brothers, most super-villains in the series belong to The Guild of Calamitous Intent, which regulates their menacing activities towards their respective protagonists, while also shielding said villains from criminal prosecution. Much of the show's storyline revolves around politics within the Guild.
 In Hiro Mashima’s work ‘’Fairy Tail’’, there exists a guild of that name, including many other kinds of guilds in the kingdom of Fiore.
 In the series ‘’The Lord of the Rings: The Rings of Power’’, the powerful kingdom of Númenor is characterized by several guilds, each signified by a metal crest worn on the torso, and acquiring one of these crests is a minor plot point. A key politician, Pharazôn, seems to have earned membership in all of the guilds and wears their crests.

See also 

 Bourgeois of Brussels
 Bourgeois of Paris
 Catholic Police Guild
 Cohong – Chinese guilds of merchants 
 Collegium - Roman associations similar to medieval guilds
 Community of practice
 Company of Merchant Adventurers of London 
 Company of Merchant Adventurers to New Lands
 Cooperative
 Craft Unionism
 Distributism
 Timpani Guilds
 Germania (guild) – merchants' guilds in Valencia, Spain
 Guildhall
 Guilds of Brussels
 Guild of Saint Luke — painter's guilds
 Guild of St. Bernulphus
 Guild socialism
 Hanseatic League
 List of guilds in the United Kingdom
 Meistersinger - a German guild of poets, songwriters, and musicians
 Merchant 
 Puy - a French guild of poets and musicians
 Retail
 Shreni – association of merchants, traders and artisans in India
 Trade Guilds of South India
 Trade union
 Za (guilds) – merchants' guilds in Japan

Notes

References 

 — essays by scholars covering German and Italian territories, the Netherlands, France, and England; plus guilds in cloth spinning, painting, glass blowing, goldsmithing, pewterware, book-selling, and clock making.
 Comparative study of the origins and development of merchant guilds in Europe, esp. their emergence during the late Middle Ages and their decline in the Early Modern era

Further reading 

 Gordon Emery, Curious Chester (1999) 

Ogilvie, Sheilagh. 2019. The European Guilds: An Economic Analysis. Princeton University Press. covers 1000 to 1880.
 Rosser, Gervase. The Art of Solidarity in the Middle Ages: Guilds in England 1250-1550, Oxford University Press, 2015, https://books.google.com/books?id=A0rTBgAAQBAJ

External links

Medieval Guilds – World History Encyclopedia

Medieval guilds
St. Eloy's Hospice The last Guild House in Utrecht (archived 28 November 2006)

Crafts
 
Medieval economics